Ke Lingling (born 1951; ; also known as Ke Xiaoming) is the ex-wife of Xi Jinping, who is now the General Secretary of the Chinese Communist Party and known as the paramount leader. She is from Puning, Guangdong, and is the daughter of former Chinese diplomat Ke Hua.

Personal life 
In 1979, Ke Lingling married Xi Jinping, but their life philosophy differed. Ke wanted to move to the UK, where her father at this time served as ambassador, but Xi refused to accompany her. In 1982 they divorced, ending three years of marriage; they had no children. After they divorced, Ke immigrated to the UK.

Notes

References 

Chaoshanese people
Chinese emigrants to the United Kingdom
Xi Jinping family
People from Jieyang
21st-century Chinese women
20th-century Chinese women
1951 births
Living people